Medicaid Waiver programs help provide services to people who would otherwise be in an institution, nursing home, or hospital to receive long-term care in the community. Prior to 1991, the Federal Medicaid program paid for services only if a person lived in an institution. The approval of Federal Medicaid Waiver programs allowed states to provide services to consumers in their homes and in their communities.

Types of Medicaid Waiver Programs

 Katie Beckett or TEFRA waivers: allow children under the age of nineteen  to receive medical care in their home without regard to their parents' income level, provided the cost of in-home care is less or equal to cost of providing the care in a hospital setting.
 Section 1115 Research & Demonstration Projects: States can apply for program flexibility to test new or existing approaches to financing and delivering Medicaid and CHIP.
 Section 1915(b) Managed Care Waivers: States can apply for waivers to provide services through managed care delivery systems or otherwise limit people's choice of providers. 
 Section 1915(c) Home and Community-Based Services Waivers: States can apply for waivers to provide long-term care services in home and community settings rather than institutional settings. 
 Concurrent Section 1915(b) and 1915(c) Waivers: States can apply to simultaneously implement two types of waivers to provide a continuum of services to the elderly and people with disabilities, as long as all Federal requirements for both programs are met.

References

Federal assistance in the United States
Medicare and Medicaid (United States)